Elachista zeta is a moth of the family Elachistidae. It is found in Australia.

References

Moths described in 2011
zeta
Moths of Australia